Ipatovo may refer to:
Ipatovo kurgan, an archaeological site in Russia
Ipatovo Urban Settlement, a municipal formation which the Town of Ipatovo in Ipatovsky District of Stavropol Krai, Russia is incorporated as
Ipatovo (inhabited locality), several inhabited localities in Russia